The 3 arrondissements of the Yonne department are:
 Arrondissement of Auxerre, (prefecture of the Yonne department: Auxerre) with 170 communes. The population of the arrondissement was 165,987 in 2016.
 Arrondissement of Avallon, (subprefecture: Avallon) with 135 communes. The population of the arrondissement was 43,189 in 2016.
 Arrondissement of Sens, (subprefecture: Sens) with 118 communes.  The population of the arrondissement was 131,368 in 2016.

History

In 1800 the arrondissements of Auxerre, Avallon, Joigny, Sens and Tonnerre were established. The arrondissements of Joigny and Tonnerre were abolished in 1926. 

The borders of the arrondissements of Yonne were modified in January 2017:
 three communes from the arrondissement of Auxerre to the arrondissement of Avallon
 12 communes from the arrondissement of Auxerre to the arrondissement of Sens
 13 communes from the arrondissement of Avallon to the arrondissement of Auxerre

References

Yonne